Jane Lew High was a high school located in Jane Lew, West Virginia and was in operation from 1912 to 1966. In 1966 the school consolidated with Weston and Walkersville High Schools to create Lewis County High School
in Weston, West Virginia. The School also won the 1922 WVSSAC Class B Boys Basketball tournament against Blackville 17–15.

References

External links
Lewis County High School

High schools in West Virginia
Educational institutions established in 1912
1912 establishments in West Virginia
Educational institutions disestablished in 1966
1966 disestablishments in West Virginia